Guidance Residential LLC.  is a U.S. based  Islamic home financing company  headquartered in Reston, Virginia. The company started operation in 2002 to provide Shariah compliant, riba-free (free of interest or usury)  home financing contracts to Muslim American home buyers. Guidance Residential is a wholly owned subsidiary of Guidance Financial Group, which is a subsidiary of the parent company, Capital Guidance. The company finances residential homes through its Declining Balance Co-Ownership Program, also known as diminishing Musharaka.

The company is supervised by an independent Shariah Supervisory Board.

Company

Guidance Financial Group’s founder and Chairman Dr. Mohammad Hammour led a group to form Guidance Residential and embarked upon a multimillion-dollar R&D project to launch a Shariah-compliant home financing program for consumers in the United States. The project engaged 18 law firms and six world-renowned Islamic Finance Scholars to devise an authentic home ownership model compliant with both American and Islamic legal systems. After three years of research and development, Guidance Residential successfully designed their signature Declining Balance Co-ownership Program and launched Shariah-compliant home financing operations in 3 states. Freddie Mac agreed to cooperate with Guidance Residential as an investor to provide liquidity.

External links
 Official web site

Financial services companies established in 2002
Mortgage lenders of the United States